Pokrovka is a rural locality (a selo) in Bichursky District, Republic of Buryatia, Russia. The population was 298 as of 2010. There are 2 streets.

Geography 
Pokrovka is located 20 km northwest of Bichura (the district's administrative centre) by road. Sudutuy is the nearest rural locality.

References 

Rural localities in Bichursky District